Papar Station (station code: PPR) is a third-class railway station in Papar, Papar, Kediri Regency, East Java, Indonesia, operated by Kereta Api Indonesia. This railway station is located 200 m east of Kertosono–Kediri Road.

Services

Local/regional train 
 Dhoho, destination of  via  and

References

External links 

 Kereta Api Indonesia - Indonesian railway company's official website

Kediri Regency
Railway stations in East Java